The 44th annual Toronto International Film Festival was held from 5 to 15 September 2019. The opening gala was the documentary film Once Were Brothers: Robbie Robertson and The Band, directed by Daniel Roher, and the festival closed with a screening of the biographical film Radioactive, directed by Marjane Satrapi.

Awards
In addition to its regular film awards, whose winners were announced at the conclusion of the festival, the festival also announced the inaugural TIFF Tribute Awards, a special program to honour distinguished lifetime achievement in film. Tribute Awards were presented to Meryl Streep and Joaquin Phoenix for acting, Taika Waititi for directing, cinematographer Roger Deakins for artisan film craft, Mati Diop for emerging talent, Participant Media for impact media, and David Foster for special contributions to film.

The first award recipients were announced on 12 September, with the major awards announced at the close of the festival on 15 September. In light of the fact that international filmmakers are rarely still in Toronto to accept their awards in person by the end of the festival, the organizers opted to cancel the traditional awards ceremony, and instead announced the award winners through TIFF's social media.

Nicolas Cage was awarded with the Creative Coalition's Spotlight Initiative Award for his role in Color Out of Space.

Programmes
The selection for the 2019 festival:

Gala presentations

Special events

Special presentations

Contemporary World Cinema

Masters

Documentaries

Discovery

Short Cuts

Midnight Madness

Platform

Primetime

Cinemathèque

Wavelengths

Canada's Top Ten
TIFF's annual Canada's Top Ten list, its national critics and festival programmers poll of the ten best feature and short films of the year, was released on 11 December 2019.

Feature films
And the Birds Rained Down (Il pleuvait des oiseaux) — Louise Archambault
Anne at 13,000 Ft. — Kazik Radwanski
Antigone — Sophie Deraspe
Black Conflux — Nicole Dorsey
The Body Remembers When the World Broke Open — Elle-Máijá Tailfeathers and Kathleen Hepburn
Matthias & Maxime — Xavier Dolan
Murmur — Heather Young
One Day in the Life of Noah Piugattuk — Zacharias Kunuk
The Twentieth Century — Matthew Rankin
White Lie — Calvin Thomas and Yonah Lewis

Short films
Acadiana — Guillaume Fournier, Samuel Matteau and Yannick Nolin
Cityscape — Michael Snow
Delphine — Chloé Robichaud
Docking — Trevor Anderson
I Am in the World as Free and Slender as a Deer on a Plain — Sofia Banzhaf
Jarvik — Émilie Mannering
No Crying at the Dinner Table — Carol Nguyen
The Physics of Sorrow — Theodore Ushev
Please Speak Continuously and Describe Your Experiences as They Come to You — Brandon Cronenberg
Throat Singing in Kangirsuk (Katatjatuuk Kangirsumi) — Eva Kaukai and Manon Chamberland

References

External links

 Official site
 2019 Toronto International Film Festival at IMDb

2019
Toronto
2019 in Toronto
2019 in Canadian cinema